Ariantas () was a king of the Scythians, who, in order to learn the population of his people, commanded every Scythian to bring him one arrow-head. With these arrow-heads he made an enormous brazen or copper vessel, which was set up in a place called "Exampaeus", between the rivers Borysthenes and Hypanis. This was important because the total number of Scythians had always been difficult to determine, because of their nomadic behaviors.

We know of Ariantas only from one single passage in Herodotus.

References

Scythian rulers